James Fiennes, 2nd Viscount Saye and Sele (c. 1602 – 15 March 1674) was an English peer and MP at various times between 1625 and 1660, when he succeeded his father and entered the House of Lords.

Personal details
James Fiennes was born  1602 at Broughton Castle, Oxfordshire, eldest son of William Fiennes, 1st Viscount Saye and Sele (1582–1662), and his wife Elizabeth Temple (died 1648). His siblings included Nathaniel (1608–1669), Bridget, John (1612–1708), Constance and Elizabeth.

Sometime before 1631, Fiennes married Frances Cecil (died 1684), daughter of Edward Cecil, 1st Viscount Wimbledon. They had three sons, all of whom died as infants, plus two daughters, Frances and Elizabeth (died 1674). In the absence of a direct male heir, his nephew William (1639–1698), son of his younger brother Nathaniel, became the third Viscount Saye and Sele on his death in 1674.

Career

In 1625, Fiennes was elected Member of Parliament for Banbury. He was elected MP for Oxfordshire in 1626 and in 1628 and sat until 1629 when King Charles decided to rule without parliament for eleven years. In April 1640 he was re-elected MP for Oxfordshire in the Short Parliament. He was re-elected MP for Oxfordshire in November 1640 for the Long Parliament and sat until 1648. 

In 1660, Fiennes was elected Member of Parliament for Oxfordshire in the Convention Parliament. He succeeded to the viscountcy on the death of his father in 1662. He was Lord Lieutenant of Oxfordshire from 1668 until his death.

References

Sources

 * 

 
 

1600s births
1674 deaths
Lord-Lieutenants of Oxfordshire
Year of birth uncertain
People from Banbury
James
English MPs 1625
English MPs 1626
English MPs 1628–1629
English MPs 1640 (April)
English MPs 1640–1648
English MPs 1660
2
Alumni of Queens' College, Cambridge
 Members of Lincoln's Inn